The current Malaysian Minister of Defence is Mohamad Hasan since 3 December 2022. The minister is supported by Deputy Minister of Defence which is Adly Zahari. The Minister administers the portfolio through the Ministry of Defence.

List of ministers of defence
The following individuals have been appointed as Minister of Defence, or any of its precedent titles:

Political Party:

References

 
Ministry of Defence (Malaysia)
Lists of government ministers of Malaysia